Wuzhou Avenue is a station on Line 6 of the Shanghai Metro. It began operation on December 29, 2007.

It is located in Shanghai's Pudong New Area.

References 

Railway stations in Shanghai
Shanghai Metro stations in Pudong
Railway stations in China opened in 2007
Line 6, Shanghai Metro